Harry B. Demopoulos is a researcher in the medical aspects of free radicals, especially in the areas of ischaemic injury, the toxicity of anticancer drugs, and in spinal cord injury.  He has also been a film actor and is currently a member of the Board of Trustees of the Doris Duke Charitable Foundation.

Free radical research
Ischaemic injury (injury to cells due to oxygen deprivation) is an important cause of morbidity and mortality in humans. For example, most deaths in stroke and heart attack are secondary to ischaemic injury, a consequence of the ischemic cascade. Thus, much research has been done into the causes and treatment of ischaemic injury. One are of this research involves the essential role of free radicals (reactive oxygen species and the like) as modulators of ischaemic injury. This has resulted in therapeutic advances, such as the radical-scavenging neuroprotective agent NXY-059, which was under development for the treatment of stroke.

Demopoulos and his coworkers were active in this research. The opening sentence of a paper by Nita et al. states: "The concept of generation of free radicals during ischemia was first presented by Demopoulos, Flamm and co-workers..."

Filmography

Doris Duke estate
Harry Demopoulos is a trustee of the Doris Duke Charitable Foundation, founded upon the death of the billionaire tobacco heiress. When Duke died in 1993 at the age of 80, legal documents revealed she had previously assigned Demopoulos – a longtime friend – co-executor of her estate. However, a controversial change to her will near her death put her vast fortune in the control of her Irish-born butler, Bernard Lafferty, whom Demopoulos described in a subsequent lawsuit as "an illiterate, unstable and even dangerous person."  The litigants produced an affidavit from Tammy Payette, 28, a nurse who had attended to Duke in her final weeks. Payette maintained that Kivowitz (one of Duke's doctors) and Lafferty had conspired to murder Duke through the use of "massive sedation, including morphine and Demerol." This lawsuit resulted in Lafferty being discharged.

References

External links
 

Living people
American medical researchers
American male film actors
Year of birth missing (living people)